This is a list of British Army Installations in the United Kingdom and overseas. British overseas bases are concentrated in Cyprus, Brunei, Kenya, the South Atlantic and Germany.

Overseas installations

Belize

British Overseas Territories

Bermuda

British Indian Ocean Territory

Cayman Islands

Falkland Islands

Gibraltar
British Forces Gibraltar (BFG) maintains the garrison at Gibraltar.

Sovereign Base Areas of Akrotiri and Dhekelia
The two British enclaves in the Republic of Cyprus act as platforms for the projection of British military assets in the Eastern Mediterranean and the Middle East. The enclaves serve as centres for regional communications monitoring from the eastern Mediterranean through the Middle East to Iran. Facilities within the retained areas also support British military activities on retained sites in the Republic of Cyprus and provide unique training opportunities.

Turks & Caicos Islands

Brunei
Around 2000 Army personnel, largely from the 1st Battalion Royal Gurkha Rifles, are stationed in Brunei (Britain's largest remaining east of Suez deployment). Medicine Lines, Tuker Lines and Scout Base are close to the town of Seria whilst Sittang Camp's more isolated placement in Tutong District reflects its role as a Jungle Training Centre.

Canada
Following the withdrawal of the RAF from CFB Goose Bay, the sole British deployment in Canada is the Army Training Unit at Suffield.

Cyprus
In addition to the Sovereign Base Areas of Akrotiri and Dhekelia, the 1960 Treaty of Establishment between the United Kingdom and the Republic of Cyprus granted the UK the right to permanently make use of 40 further sites on the island for military purposes.

Three retained army facilities are not currently in use by British Forces Cyprus as a result of the Cyprus Conflict.

Britain also makes a permanent contribution to the United Nations Peacekeeping Force in Cyprus.

Germany
In 2010 approximately 25,000 British soldiers were permanently based in western Germany, a legacy of World War II and the Cold War. Facilities in Germany are no longer strategically useful, therefore British Forces began withdrawing from Germany in 2010; in 2015 21,500 troops remained in the country. The deployment had been phased out by 2020, although concentrations of installations and troops in the Paderborn / Bielefeld / Gütersloh area and at Mansergh Barracks will remain until late in the decade.

Nepal
The British Army presence in Nepal is related to the Brigade of Gurkhas. British Gurkhas Nepal manages the recruitment of soldiers, the care of families and ensures the rights of veterans.

Oman

Sierra Leone

Iraq

Kenya
The British Army presence in Kenya is based around the British Army Training Unit Kenya (BATUK).

United Kingdom

See also
 List of airfields of the Army Air Corps
 List of Royal Air Force stations
 List of Royal Navy shore establishments
 List of Royal Marines establishments
 British Forces Cyprus
 British Forces South Atlantic Islands
 British Forces Gibraltar

References

Notes

External links

 
 
 
 
 
 
Lists of military installations
United Kingdom military-related lists